WordPress (WP or WordPress.org) is a free and open-source content management system (CMS) written in hypertext preprocessor (PHP) language and paired with a MySQL or MariaDB database with supported HTTPS. Features include a plugin architecture and a template system, referred to within WordPress as "Themes". WordPress was originally created as a blog-publishing system but has evolved to support other web content types including more traditional mailing lists and Internet fora, media galleries, membership sites, learning management systems (LMS) and online stores. WordPress is used by 42.8% of the top 10 million websites .

WordPress was released on May 27, 2003, by its founders, American developer Matt Mullenweg and English developer Mike Little, as a fork of b2/cafelog. The software is released under the GPLv2 (or later) license.

To function, WordPress has to be installed on a web server, either part of an Internet hosting service like WordPress.com or a computer running the software package WordPress.org in order to serve as a network host in its own right. A local computer may be used for single-user testing and learning purposes.

WordPress Foundation owns WordPress, WordPress projects, and other related trademarks.

Overview 

"WordPress is a factory that makes webpages" is a core analogy designed to clarify the functions of WordPress: it stores content and enables a user to create and publish webpages, requiring nothing beyond a domain and a hosting service.

WordPress has a web template system using a template processor. Its architecture is a front controller, routing all requests for non-static URIs to a single PHP file that parses the URI and identifies the target page. This allows support for more human-readable permalinks.

Themes 
WordPress users may install and switch among many different themes. Themes allow users to change the look and functionality of a WordPress website without altering the core code or site content. Custom code can be added to the website by using a child theme. Every WordPress website requires at least one theme to be present. Themes may be directly installed using the WordPress "Appearance" administration tool in the dashboard, or theme folders may be copied directly into the themes directory. WordPress themes are generally classified into two categories: free and premium. Many free themes are listed in the WordPress theme directory (also known as the repository), and premium themes are available for purchase from marketplaces and individual WordPress developers. WordPress users may also create and develop their own custom themes.

Plugins 
WordPress' plugin architecture allows users to extend the features and functionality of a website or blog. , WordPress.org has 59,756 plugins available, each of which offers custom functions and features enabling users to tailor their sites to their specific needs.  However, this does not include the premium plugins that are available (approximately 1,500+), which may not be listed in the WordPress.org repository. These customizations range from search engine optimization (SEO) to client portals used to display private information to logged-in users, to content management systems, to content displaying features, such as the addition of widgets and navigation bars. Not all available plugins are always abreast with the upgrades, and as a result, they may not function properly or may not function at all. If the plugin developer has not tested the plugin with the last two major versions of WordPress, a warning message will be displayed on the plugin directory, informing users that the plugin may not work properly with the latest WordPress version. Most plugins are available through WordPress themselves, either via downloading them and installing the files manually via FTP or through the WordPress dashboard. However, many third parties offer plugins through their own websites, many of which are paid packages.

Web developers who wish to develop plugins need to learn WordPress' hook system, which consists of over 2,000 hooks (as of Version 5.7 in 2021) divided into two categories: action hooks and filter hooks.

Plugins also represent a development strategy that can transform WordPress into all sorts of software systems and applications, limited only by the imagination and creativity of programmers. These are implemented using custom plugins to create non-website systems, such as headless WordPress applications and Software as a Service (SaaS) products.

Plugins could also be used by hackers targeting sites that use WordPress, as hackers could exploit bugs in WordPress plugins instead of bugs in WordPress itself.

Mobile applications 
Phone apps for WordPress exist for WebOS, Android, iOS, Windows Phone, and BlackBerry. These applications, designed by Automattic, have options such as adding new blog posts and pages, commenting, moderating comments, replying to comments in addition to the ability to view the stats.

Accessibility 
The WordPress Accessibility Team has worked to improve the accessibility for core WordPress as well as support a clear identification of accessible themes. The WordPress Accessibility Team provides continuing educational support about web accessibility and inclusive design. The WordPress Accessibility Coding Standards state that "All new or updated code released in WordPress must conform with the Web Content Accessibility Guidelines 2.0 at level AA."

Other features 
WordPress also features integrated link management, a search engine–friendly, clean permalink structure; the ability to assign multiple categories to posts; and support for tagging of posts. Automatic filters are also included, providing standardized formatting and styling of text in posts (for example, converting regular quotes to smart quotes). WordPress also supports the Trackback and Pingback standards for displaying links to other sites that have themselves linked to a post or an article. WordPress posts can be edited in HTML, using the visual editor, or using one of a number of plugins that allow for a variety of customized editing features.

Multi-user and multi-blogging 
Prior to version 3, WordPress supported one blog per installation, although multiple concurrent copies may be run from different directories if configured to use separate database tables. WordPress Multisites (previously referred to as WordPress Multi-User, WordPress MU, or WPMU) was a fork of WordPress created to allow multiple blogs to exist within one installation but is able to be administered by a centralized maintainer. WordPress MU makes it possible for those with websites to host their own blogging communities, as well as control and moderate all the blogs from a single dashboard. WordPress MU adds eight new data tables for each blog.

As of the release of WordPress 3, WordPress MU has merged with WordPress.

History 
b2/cafelog, more commonly known as b2 or catalog, was the precursor to WordPress. b2/cafelog was estimated to have been installed on approximately 2,000 blogs as of May 2003. It was written in PHP for use with MySQL by Michel Valdrighi, who is now a contributing developer to WordPress. Although WordPress is the official successor, another project, b2evolution, is also in active development.

As the development of b2/cafelog slowed down / stagnate, Matt Mullenweg began pondering the idea of forking b2/cafelog, along with new features that he would want in the new CMS, in a blog post written on January 24, 2003. Mike Little, a professional developer, became the first to comment on the blog post expressing interest to contribute. The two worked together to create the first version of WordPress, version 0.70, which was released on May 27, 2003. Christine Selleck Tremoulet, a friend of Mullenweg, suggested the name WordPress.

In 2004 the licensing terms for the competing Movable Type package were changed by Six Apart, resulting in many of its most influential users migrating to WordPress. By October 2009 the Open Source CMS MarketShare Report concluded that WordPress enjoyed the greatest brand strength of any open-source content management system.

As of May 2021, WordPress is used by 64.8% of all the websites whose content management system is known. This is 41.4% of the top 10 million websites.

Awards and recognition 
 Winner of InfoWorld's "Best of open source software awards: Collaboration", awarded in 2008.
 Winner of Open Source CMS Awards' "Overall Best Open Source CMS", awarded in 2009.
 Winner of digital synergy's "Hall of Fame CMS category in the 2010 Open Source", awarded in 2010.
 Winner of InfoWorld's "Bossie award for Best Open Source Software", awarded in 2011.
 WordPress has a five star privacy rating from the Electronic Frontier Foundation.

Release and requirements history 
Main releases of WordPress are codenamed after well-known jazz musicians, starting from version 1.0.

Although only the current release is officially supported, security updates are backported "as a courtesy" to all versions as far back as 4.0.

There are also PHP requirements for each WordPress version. This involves both PHP version requirements as well as required PHP extensions plus other optional PHP extensions.

WordPress 5.0 "Bebo" 

The December 2018 release of WordPress 5.0, "Bebo", is named in homage to the pioneering Cuban jazz musician Bebo Valdés.

It included a new default editor "Gutenberg" – a block-based editor; it allows users to modify their displayed content in a much more user-friendly way than prior iterations. Blocks are abstract units of markup that, composed together, form the content or layout of a web page. Past content that was created on WordPress pages is listed under what is referred to as a Classic Block. Prior to Gutenberg, there were several block-based editors available as WordPress plugins, e.g. Elementor. Following the release of Gutenberg, comparisons were made between it and those existing plugins.

Classic Editor plugin 
The Classic Editor plugin was created as a result of User preferences and helped website developers maintain past plugins only compatible with WordPress 4.9, giving plugin developers time to get their plugins updated & compatible with the 5.0 release. Having the Classic Editor plugin installed restores the "classic" editing experience that WordPress has had up until the WordPress 5.0 release. The Classic Editor plugin will be supported at least until 2024.

As of November 2022, the Classic Editor plugin is active on over 5 million installations of WordPress.

Vulnerabilities 

Many security issues have been uncovered in the software, particularly in 2007, 2008, and 2015. According to Secunia, WordPress in April 2009 had seven unpatched security advisories (out of 32 total), with a maximum rating of "Less Critical". Secunia maintains an up-to-date list of WordPress vulnerabilities.

In January 2007, many high-profile search engine optimization (SEO) blogs, as well as many low-profile commercial blogs featuring AdSense, were targeted and attacked with a WordPress exploit. A separate vulnerability on one of the project site's web servers allowed an attacker to introduce exploitable code in the form of a back door to some downloads of WordPress 2.1.1. The 2.1.2 release addressed this issue; an advisory released at the time advised all users to upgrade immediately.

In May 2007, a study revealed that 98% of WordPress blogs being run were exploitable because they were running outdated and unsupported versions of the software. In part to mitigate this problem, WordPress made updating the software a much easier, "one-click" automated process in version 2.7 (released in December 2008). However, the filesystem security settings required to enable the update process can be an additional risk.

In a June 2007 interview, Stefan Esser, the founder of the PHP Security Response Team, spoke critically of WordPress' security track record, citing problems with the application's architecture that made it unnecessarily difficult to write code that is secure from SQL injection vulnerabilities, as well as some other problems.

In June 2013, it was found that some of the 50 most downloaded WordPress plugins were vulnerable to common Web attacks such as SQL injection and XSS. A separate inspection of the top 10 e-commerce plugins showed that seven of them were vulnerable.

In an effort to promote better security and to streamline the update experience overall, automatic background updates were introduced in WordPress 3.7.

Individual installations of WordPress can be protected with security plugins that prevent user enumeration, hide resources and thwart probes. Users can also protect their WordPress installations by taking steps such as keeping all WordPress installations, themes, and plugins updated, using only trusted themes and plugins, and editing the site's .htaccess configuration file if supported by the webserver to prevent many types of SQL injection attacks and block unauthorized access to sensitive files. It is especially important to keep WordPress plugins updated because would-be hackers can easily list all the plugins a site uses and then run scans searching for any vulnerabilities against those plugins. If vulnerabilities are found, they may be exploited to allow hackers to, for example, upload their own files (such as a web shell) that collect sensitive information.

Developers can also use tools to analyze potential vulnerabilities, including Jetpack Protect, WPScan, WordPress Auditor, and WordPress Sploit Framework developed by 0pc0deFR. These types of tools research known vulnerabilities, such as CSRF, LFI, RFI, XSS, SQL injection, and user enumeration. However, not all vulnerabilities can be detected by tools, so it is advisable to check the code of plugins, themes, and other add-ins from other developers.

In March 2015, it was reported that the Yoast SEO plugin was vulnerable to SQL injection, allowing attackers to potentially execute arbitrary SQL commands. The issue was fixed in version 1.7.4 of the plugin.

In January 2017, security auditors at Sucuri identified a vulnerability in the WordPress REST API that would allow any unauthenticated user to modify any post or page within a site running WordPress 4.7 or greater. The auditors quietly notified WordPress developers, and within six days WordPress released a high-priority patch to version 4.7.2, which addressed the problem.

As of WordPress 6.0, the minimum PHP version requirement is PHP 5.6, which was released on August 28, 2014, and which has been unsupported by the PHP Group and not received any security patches since December 31, 2018. Thus, WordPress recommends using PHP version 7.4 or greater.

In the absence of specific alterations to their default formatting code, WordPress-based websites use the canvas element to detect whether the browser is able to correctly render emoji. Because Tor Browser does not currently discriminate between this legitimate use of the Canvas API and an effort to perform canvas fingerprinting, it warns that the website is attempting to 'extract HTML5 canvas image data. Ongoing efforts seek workarounds to reassure privacy advocates while retaining the ability to check for proper emoji rendering capability.

Development and support

Key developers 
Matt Mullenweg and Mike Little were co-founders of the project. The core lead developers include Helen Hou-Sandí, Dion Hulse, Mark Jaquith, Matt Mullenweg, Andrew Ozz, and Andrew Nacin.

WordPress is also developed by its community, including WP tester, a group of volunteers who test each release. They have early access to nightly builds, beta versions, and release candidates. Errors are documented in a special mailing list or the project's Trac tool.

Though largely developed by the community surrounding it, WordPress is closely associated with Automattic, the company founded by Matt Mullenweg.

WordPress Foundation 
WordPress Foundation is a non-profit organization that was set up to support the WordPress project. The purpose of the organization is to guarantee open access to WordPress's software projects forever. As part of this, the organization owns and manages WordPress, WordCamp, and related trademarks. In January 2010, Matt Mullenweg formed the organization to own and manage the trademarks of WordPress project. Previously  from 2006 onwards  Automattic acted as a short-term owner of the WordPress trademarks. From the beginning, he intended later to place the WordPress trademarks with the WordPress Foundation, which did not yet exist in 2006 and which eventually took longer to set up than expected.

WordPress Photo Directory 
On December 14, 2021, Matt Mullenweg announced the WordPress Photo Directory at the State of the Word 2021 event. It is an open-source image directory for open images maintained by the WordPress project. The image directory aims to provide an open alternative to closed image banks, such as Unsplash, Pixbaby, and Adobe Stock, whose licensing terms have become restrictive in recent years. Use in WordPress themes, for example, is restricted. In January 2022, the project began to gather volunteers, and in February, its own developer website was launched, where team representatives were next selected.

WordCamp developer and user conferences 

WordCamps are casual, locally organized conferences covering everything related to WordPress. The first such event was WordCamp 2006 in August 2006 in San Francisco, which lasted one day and had over 500 attendees. The first WordCamp outside San Francisco was held in Beijing in September 2007. Since then, there have been over 1,022 WordCamps in over 75 cities in 65 countries around the world. WordCamp San Francisco 2014 was the last official annual conference of WordPress developers and users taking place in San Francisco, having now been replaced with WordCamp US. First ran in 2013 as WordCamp Europe, regional WordCamps in other geographical regions are held with the aim of connecting people who aren't already active in their local communities and inspire attendees to start user communities in their hometowns. In 2019, the Nordic region had its own WordCamp Nordic. The first WordCamp Asia was to be held in 2020, but cancelled due to the COVID-19 pandemic.

Support 
WordPress' primary support website is WordPress.org. This support website hosts both WordPress Codex, the online manual for WordPress and a living repository for WordPress information and documentation,
and WordPress Forums, an active online community of WordPress users.

See also 
 Weblog software
 NextGEN Gallery
 List of content management systems
 WordPress.com

References

External links 

 

 
2003 software
Automattic
Blog software
Content management systems
Free and open-source Android software
Free content management systems
Free software programmed in PHP
Software forks
Software using the GPL license
Website management